Awakening, in comics, may refer to:

 The Awakening  (Image Comics) by Stephen Blue, published in 1997 by Image Comics
 The Awakening  (Oni Press) by Neal Shaffer and Luca Genovese, published in 2004 by Oni Press
 Awakening (Archaia), by Nick Tapalansky and Alex Eckman-Lawn, published in 2007 by Archaia Studios Press
 Awakenings (comics), Eric Hobbs and Gabe Pena, published in 2004 by Eighth Day Entertainment
 Awakening Comics, a company and title by Steve Peters
 I Am Legend: Awakening, film tie-in, published in 2007 by DC Comics
 Starchild: Awakenings, published in 2008 by Coppervale Press
 "Awakening", the story in Stone, by Image Comics

See also
 Awakening (disambiguation)